Bromodomain-containing protein 7 is a protein that in humans is encoded by the BRD7 gene.

Interactions
BRD7 has been shown to interact with IRF2 and HNRPUL1.

Azoospermia

BRD7 protein is a transcription regulator that is normally highly expressed in the testis, particularly in meiotic pachytene and diplotene spermatocytes and in round spermatids.  However, in the testes of patients exhibiting spermatogenesis arrest and azoospermia, BRD7 protein expression is observed to be absent or reduced.  Homozygous knockout mice [BRD7(-/-)] are infertile and have increased DNA damage and apoptosis in their germline.

References

External links

Further reading